Cornelis Jonson van Ceulen the Younger (1634–1715), was an English painter active in the Netherlands.

He was born in London as the son of the English painter Cornelis Janssens van Ceulen and was baptised on 15 August 1634 at St Ann Blackfriars. He moved with his parents to Utrecht as a young boy in 1643.
He presumably was trained there and it is where he married in 1668. Though he is documented in England during the years 1675–1678, he seems to have spent most of his life in Utrecht, where he later died.

References

External link

Cornelis van Ceulen on Artnet

1634 births
1715 deaths
18th-century English painters
Painters from London
Artists from Utrecht
17th-century English painters
English male painters
Dutch Golden Age painters
Dutch male painters
18th-century English male artists